The Sienese School of painting flourished in Siena, Italy, between the 13th and 15th centuries. Its most important artists include Duccio, whose work shows Byzantine influence, his pupil Simone Martini, the brothers Pietro and Ambrogio Lorenzetti and Domenico and Taddeo di Bartolo, Sassetta, and Matteo di Giovanni.

History

Duccio may be considered the "father of Sienese painting". The brothers Pietro and Ambrogio Lorenzetti were "responsible for a crucial development in Sienese art, moving from the tradition inherited from Duccio towards a Gothic style, incorporating the innovations in Florence introduced by Giotto and Arnolfo di Cambio".

"Sienese art flourished even when Siena itself had begun to decline economically and politically. And while the artists of 15th-century Siena did not enjoy the widespread patronage and respect that their 14th-century ancestors had received, the paintings and illuminated manuscripts they produced form one of the undervalued treasures in the bounty of Italian art."

In the late 15th century, Siena "finally succumbed" to the Florentine school's teachings on perspective and naturalistic representation, absorbing its "humanist culture". In the 16th century the Mannerists Beccafumi and Il Sodoma worked there. While Baldassare Peruzzi was born and trained in Siena, his major works and style reflect his long career in Rome. The economic and political decline of Siena by the 16th century, and its eventual subjugation by Florence, largely checked the development of Sienese painting, although it also meant that a good proportion of Sienese works in churches and public buildings were not discarded or destroyed.

Style
Unlike Florentine art, Sienese art opted for a more decorative style and rich colors, with "thinner, elegant, and courtly figures". It also has "a mystical streak...characterized by a common focus on miraculous events, with less attention to proportions, distortions of time and place, and often dreamlike coloration". Sienese painters did not paint portraits, allegories, or classical myths.

List of artists

1251–1300
 Guido da Siena

1301–1350

 Duccio di Buoninsegna
 Segna di Buonaventura
 Niccolò di Segna
 Simone Martini
 Lippo Memmi
 Naddo Ceccarelli
 Ambrogio Lorenzetti
 Pietro Lorenzetti
 Bartolomeo Bulgarini
 Ugolino di Nerio
 Lippo Vanni

1351–1400
 Bartolo di Fredi
 Andrea Vanni
 Francesco di Vannuccio
 Jacopo di Mino del Pellicciaio
 Niccolò di Bonaccorso
 Niccolò di Ser Sozzo
 Luca di Tommè
 Taddeo di Bartolo
 Andrea di Bartolo
 Paolo di Giovanni Fei
 (Master of the Richardson Triptych)
  Biagio Goro Ghezzi

1401–1450

 Benedetto di Bindo
 Domenico di Bartolo
 Giovanni di Paolo
 Gregorio di Cecco
 Martino di Bartolomeo
 Master of the Osservanza Triptych
 Pietro di Giovanni d'Ambrogio
 Priamo della Quercia
 Sano di Pietro
 Sassetta (Stefano di Giovanni)
 Lorenzo di Pietro (Vecchietta)

1451–1500
 Nicola di Ulisse
 Matteo di Giovanni
 Benvenuto di Giovanni
 Carlo di Giovanni
 Francesco di Giorgio Martini
 Neroccio di Bartolomeo de' Landi
 Pietro di Francesco degli Orioli
 Guidoccio Cozzarelli
 Bernardino Fungai
 Pellegrino di Mariano
 Andrea di Niccolò
 Pietro di Domenico

1501–1550

 Girolamo di Benvenuto
 Giacomo Pacchiarotti
 Girolamo del Pacchia
 Domenico Beccafumi
 Il Sodoma (Giovanni Antonio Bazzi)
 Riccio Sanese (Bartolomeo Neroni)

1601–1650
 Francesco Vanni
 Ventura Salimbeni
 Rutilio Manetti

See also 
 Bolognese School
 Lucchese School
 School of Ferrara
 Florentine School

References

Further reading
  (see index)
 Timothy Hyman; Sienese Painting, Thames & Hudson, 2003 .

External links

 Italian paintings : a catalogue of the collection of the Metropolitan Museum of Art : Sienese and Central Italian schools, a collection catalog containing information about the artists and their works (see index)

 
Painters from Tuscany
Italian art movements
Gothic art